Hemophage may refer to:

Hematophagy
Plot device for Ultraviolet (film)